Echinopsis adolfofriedrichii,  is a species of Echinopsis found in Paraguay.

References

External links
 
 

adolfofriedrichii